The New Language of Carbon, an idea first developed in architect William McDonough’s article, “Carbon Is Not The Enemy,” was originally published in the journal Nature.

Carbon positive cities 
McDonough, alongside his Charlottesville-based architecture firm, William McDonough + Partners, utilized the New Language of Carbon to develop a framework for designing Carbon Positive Cities. The concept is also closely related to Breathing Cities, which he presented at the Arctic Circle China Forum in Shanghai in May 2019 and focuses on releasing less carbon and fewer toxic chemicals into the air and instead shifts to integrating renewable energy such as geothermal as a solution to air pollution and climate change.

Implementing a carbon positive framework for cities is one method of combating climate change. The aim is for cities to embrace carbon as an asset in soil, plants and “durable” earthbound forms, while eliminating it as a liability in the atmosphere.

The goal of carbon positive cities is to reduce the liability of atmospheric carbon while also increasing earthbound carbon as an asset; integrate and celebrate urban development  as a unified, productive and restorative ecosystem; recognize beneficial uses of carbon for their short and long-term ecological, economic, and social value; optimize the relationships between a city, its local hinterland, and remote territories and envision agriculture as an organizing element of urban form and operations.

Circular carbon economy 
At COP25 in Madrid, William McDonough and marine ecologist Carlos Duarte presented the Circular Carbon Economy at an event with the BBVA Foundation. The Circular Carbon Economy is based on McDonough’s ideas from Carbon Is Not The Enemy and aims to serve as the framework for developing and organizing effective systems for carbon management.

McDonough used the Circular Carbon Economy to frame discussions at the G20 workshops in March of 2020.

Reception 
Since Carbon Is Not The Enemy was first published, numerous outlets such as Scientific American and Fast Company have praised it for reframing the conversation around carbon emissions. Others have noted the confusion generated by this attempt to create new terminology, “Carbon positive is mainly a marketing term, and understandably confusing–we generally avoid it.”  

Since the first mention of Carbon Positive Cities, several municipalities have used this as an evaluation of their environmental goals. Baoding, China was called the “first ‘carbon positive’ city” by the United Nations. The Liverpool City Council also announced their ambition to be “the world’s first carbon positive city by 2020” by using blockchain technology.

See also 

 Embedded emissions

References 

Neologisms
Carbon
Climate change mitigation